The Massingham Affair is a British period crime television series which originally aired on BBC 2 in six episodes from 12 September to 17 October 1964. It is an adaptation of the 1962 novel of the same title by Edward Grierson. Unlike many BBC series of this era, it is believed all six episodes survive intact, but remain unreleased since their original broadcast.

Synopsis
In the late nineteenth century, the violent robbery of a vicar and his daughter leads to two men being convicted and sentenced to life imprisonment. However, a young solicitor Justin Derry is unconvinced of the verdict and sets out to exonerate them.

Cast

 Lyndon Brook as Justin Derry
 Andrew Keir as Superintendent Blair
 Renny Lister as Jean Kelly
 Eileen Atkins as Charlotte Verney
 George Cormack as Reverend Verney
 Geoffrey Bayldon as Mr. Lumley
 Bernard Kay as Jim Longford
 Robert Cawdron as PC Hugh
 Patsy Rowlands as Georgina Deverel
 Barry Wilsher as Mick Kelly
 John Wentworth as  Colonel Deverel
 Norman Rodway as Mr. Gilmore
 John Barrett as George Sugden
 John Cazabon as Mr. Harris 
 George Little as Pat Milligan
 Harry Littlewood as Joe Henderson 
 Cynthia Etherington as Mrs. Sugden
 William Mervyn as Mr. Jessop
 Frieda Knorr as Amy Dodds
 John Rae as  The Judge
 Mary Webster as Maggie Binns
 William Gordon as Court Usher 
 Joby Blanshard as PC Luke 
 John Wilding as Warder
 Gladys Dawson as Grannie Binns
 Benn Simons as PC Moffatt
 Robert Gregory as  Urchin
 Elizabeth Digby-Smith as Lucy
 Morris Parsons as A Man
 Erik Chitty as Mr. Rees
 Ronald Adam as Mr. Paget
 Philip Howard as Mr. Fortescue
 A.J. Brown as Judge
 Denis Cleary as Servant
 George Betton as Clerk of the Court
 Ian Cunningham as  Foreman of the Jury

References

Bibliography
Baskin, Ellen . Serials on British Television, 1950-1994. Scolar Press, 1996.

External links
 

BBC television dramas
1964 British television series debuts
1964 British television series endings
1960s British drama television series
1960s British television miniseries
English-language television shows
Television shows based on British novels